Haroche is a surname. Notable people with the surname include:

Gilbert Haroche (1927–2015), American entrepreneur and businessman
Raphaël Haroche (born 1975), French singer-songwriter and actor
Serge Haroche (born 1944), French physicist